The FA Cup Giant-Killing Award was an annual award that recognised the team which achieves the most impressive giant-killing act in the FA Cup that season.

It was also known as the Ronnie Radford Giant-Killer Award, named after the Hereford United midfielder whose long-range goal against Newcastle United in a 1971–72 Third Round Replay helped bring about one of the FA Cup's most notable giant-killings. Radford scored from 30 yards to level the tie five minutes from time, and Hereford of the Southern League scored the winner in extra time through Ricky George, to advance at the expense of the First Division side.

When the award was introduced in 2010–11, fans voted for what they consider the biggest giant-killing of the season, with the victorious club being presented with the award, originally by Radford, at the FA Cup Final at Wembley Stadium. The award was discontinued after the 2018–19 season.

Winners

2010–11
Winners: Crawley Town

2011–12
Winners: Swindon Town

2012–13
Winners: Luton Town

2013–14
Winners: Sheffield United

2014–15
Winners: Bradford City

2015–16
Winners: Chesham United

2016–17
Winners: Lincoln City

2017–18
Winners: Wigan Athletic

2018–19
Winners: Oldham Athletic

References

FA Cup
English football trophies and awards